Hetty Wainthropp Investigates is a British crime drama television series, starring Patricia Routledge as the title character, Henrietta "Hetty" Wainthropp, that aired for four series between 3 January 1996 and 4 September 1998 on BBC One. The series, spawned from a pilot episode entitled "Missing Persons" aired by ITV in 1990, was co-created by writers David Cook and John Bowen, co-starred Derek Benfield as Hetty's patient husband Robert, and Dominic Monaghan as her assistant and lodger Geoffrey Shawcross.

Other co-stars in the series include John Graham Davies as local chief of police DCI Adams; Suzanne Maddock as Janet Frazer, a feisty young auto mechanic; and Frank Mills as Robert's brother Frank. In the United States, episodes have broadcast as part of PBS's anthology series Mystery!. A parody of the series, entitled Wetty Hainthropp Investigates, aired on 12 March 1999 as part of the Comic Relief telethon starring Victoria Wood, Julie Walters and Duncan Preston.

Production
Hetty Wainthropp Investigates is based on characters from the novel Missing Persons (1986) by David Cook, who co-wrote the episodes with John Bowen. The incidents in Cook's novel were inspired by his own mother's experiences. Prior to the pilot going into production, Patricia Routledge read the story Missing Persons for BBC Radio 4's A Book At Bedtime in February 1987.

In 1990 ITV broadcast a feature-length pilot, Missing Persons, featuring Tony Melody as Robert Wainthropp and Garry Halliday as Geoffrey Shawcross, but ITV opted not to pursue a series. The storyline of this episode is ignored in the subsequent BBC series, with the first episode establishing Hetty as a detective in her first case and meeting Geoffrey for the first time. The characterization of Hetty was altered considerably for the series from the pilot. The 'original' Hetty was blonde and far more 'theatrical' in her manner. Additionally, the pilot character lived in considerably better circumstances than the home seen in the series.

The BBC series was filmed primarily in Burnley, Darwen, Blackburn, Rossendale, Bolton and other locations in Lancashire.

The music for the series was composed by Nigel Hess, the cornet solo was performed by Phillip McCann and in 1997 the title track was awarded the Ivor Novello Award for best television theme.

The BBC series was popular with viewers, but no further episodes were commissioned after 1998. In 2008 Patricia Routledge said in an interview that the cast and crew had been told by the BBC at the end of the fourth series that a fifth series would be commissioned, but it never was. In 2017 Suzanne Maddock shared her memories of making Hetty Wainthropp Investigates in a 45-minute interview for "The Bill Podcast" and explained how she felt disappointed for the fans of the series that they did not get to see a proper conclusion to the series.

Synopsis 
Hetty Wainthropp is a retired working-class woman from Darwen in North West England, who has a knack for jumping to conclusions and solving crimes of varying bafflement which often are too minor to concern the police. Although on occasion her husband offers assistance, he more often than not tends to the home while Hetty gads about the countryside with young Geoffrey in search of resolution and justice. In many episodes Hetty seeks the help and advice of DCI Adams of the local constabulary.

Cast
 Patricia Routledge as Henrietta "Hetty" Wainthropp
 Derek Benfield as Robert Wainthropp
 Dominic Monaghan as Geoffrey Shawcross
 John Graham Davies as DCI Adams
 Suzanne Maddock as Janet Frazer
 Frank Mills as Frank Wainthropp

Episodes

Pilot (1990)

Series 1 (1996)

Series 2 (1996–1997)

Series 3 (1997–1998)

Series 4 (1998)

DVDs
All four series have been released on DVD in the United Kingdom and United States by Acorn Media. In Australia, the series was released by Madman Films. In Belgium and the Netherlands, the series was released by Lime-Lights Pictures.

References

External links

BBC television dramas
1996 British television series debuts
1998 British television series endings
1990s British drama television series
1990s British crime television series
Television shows based on British novels
English-language television shows
1990s British mystery television series
Detective television series